NGC 6134 is an open cluster in the constellation Norma.

References

Open clusters
Norma (constellation)
6134